Sterling Kelby Brown (born April 5, 1976) is an American actor. He is the recipient of various accolades, including three Primetime Emmy Awards and a Golden Globe Award. He was included in Time magazine's list of the 100 most influential people in the world in 2018.

Brown has portrayed Christopher Darden in the FX limited series The People v. O. J. Simpson: American Crime Story (2016) and starred as Randall Pearson in the NBC drama series This Is Us (20162022). Both roles earned him Primetime Emmy Awards and the latter also won him a Golden Globe Award. He has also had supporting roles in the films Black Panther (2018) and Waves (2019), and has appeared in the Amazon Prime comedy series The Marvelous Mrs. Maisel in 2019. He has also voiced characters in the 2019 animated films The Angry Birds Movie 2 and Frozen II.

Early life
Brown was born in St. Louis, Missouri to Sterling Brown and Aralean (Banks) Brown. He has two sisters and two brothers. His father died when he was 10 years old.

As a child, he went by the name Kelby; when he turned 16, he adopted the name Sterling, explaining in 2016:

Brown grew up in Olivette, Missouri, an inner-ring suburb of St. Louis. He attended the private Mary Institute and St. Louis Country Day School.

He graduated from Stanford University in 1998 with an acting degree. He had initially planned to major in economics with a focus on business, but fell in love with acting as a freshman. He did post-graduate study at New York University's Tisch School of the Arts, where he graduated with a Master of Fine Arts degree.

Career 
After college, Brown performed a series of roles in regional theater. He has also appeared on numerous television shows including ER, NYPD Blue, JAG, Boston Legal, Alias, Without a Trace, Supernatural, and Third Watch. He was a regular in the comedy Starved, and has also appeared in movies, including Stay with Ewan McGregor, Brown Sugar with Taye Diggs, and Trust the Man with David Duchovny and Julianne Moore.

He had a recurring role on the television series Supernatural, as vampire hunter Gordon Walker. He played Dr. Roland Burton on Army Wives and Detective Cal Beecher on Person of Interest, and appeared on Medium. In 2008, he played David Mosley on the "Patience" episode of Eli Stone. In 2016, he starred in the FX miniseries The People v. O. J. Simpson: American Crime Story as Christopher Darden, for which he won the Primetime Emmy Award for Outstanding Supporting Actor in a Limited Series or Movie at the 68th Primetime Emmy Awards.

In the theater, Brown was cast in the 2002 production of Bertolt Brecht's The Resistible Rise of Arturo Ui starring Al Pacino, Paul Giamatti, Steve Buscemi, John Goodman and Jacqueline McKenzie. In 2014, he starred as Hero in Suzan-Lori Parks' Odyssey-inspired play Father Comes Home From the Wars at New York's Public Theater. He also starred in the 2014 movie The Suspect with Mekhi Phifer. 
 
Since 2016, Brown has had a starring role in the television series This Is Us. In 2018, it made him the first African-American actor to win a Golden Globe in the Best Actor in a Television Drama category, and the first to win a Screen Actors Guild Award in the Outstanding Performance by a Male Actor in a Drama Series category. He also won, with the rest of the cast, the Screen Actors Guild Award for Outstanding Performance by an Ensemble in a Drama Series. That year he also appeared as N'Jobu in the Marvel Cinematic Universe film Black Panther.

In June 2018, Brown gave the commencement address at his alma mater Stanford University.

He appeared as a guest star in the NYPD sitcom Brooklyn Nine-Nine, and earned critical acclaim for his role as Philip Davidson, a dentist under investigation for murdering his business partner. He was nominated for an Primetime Emmy Award for Outstanding Guest Actor in a Comedy Series in 2018 for this performance.

In August 2019, he was announced at D23 Expo and on Twitter as the voice of Lieutenant Destin Mattias in Frozen II.

Personal life
Brown met actress Ryan Michelle Bathe as a college freshman at Stanford. They eloped in March 2006, but held a large ceremony in June 2007. They have two sons, Andrew and Amaré.

Filmography

Film

Television

Music videos

Theatre

Awards and nominations

References

External links

1976 births
Living people
American male television actors
African-American male actors
Tisch School of the Arts alumni
Stanford University alumni
21st-century American male actors
American male film actors
American male voice actors
Audiobook narrators
Male actors from St. Louis
People from St. Louis
Outstanding Performance by a Cast in a Motion Picture Screen Actors Guild Award winners
Outstanding Performance by a Lead Actor in a Drama Series Primetime Emmy Award winners
Outstanding Performance by a Supporting Actor in a Miniseries or Movie Primetime Emmy Award winners
Outstanding Performance by a Male Actor in a Drama Series Screen Actors Guild Award winners
Best Drama Actor Golden Globe (television) winners
Outstanding Narrator Primetime Emmy Award winners